Ablet Abdureshit (born March 1942) was the chairman of the Xinjiang Uyghur Autonomous Region of the People's Republic of China from 1993 to 2003. He served as the vice chairman of 11th Chinese People's Political Consultative Conference (CPPCC).

He was born in Yining in March 1942, joined the Chinese Communist Party in July 1960 and started working in September 1965. He graduated from department of electrical mechanics of Xinjiang Institute of Technology, and holds the title of senior engineer.

From 1991 to 1993, he served as vice chairman of Xinjiang Uyghur Autonomous Region. In 1993, he was appointed as acting chairman and vice party chief of Xinjiang. He was confirmed as the chairman of the region in 1994 and served this post until 2003. From January to May 2003, he was the chairman of Xinjiang People's Congress. He was elected to vice chairman of 10th CPPCC in March 2003 and was re-elected in March, 2008.

He was a member of 15th, 16th and 17th Central Committees of the Chinese Communist Party.

References 

 Abdul'ahat Abdulrixit

1942 births
Living people
People from Yining County
People's Republic of China politicians from Xinjiang
Uyghurs
Political office-holders in Xinjiang
Vice Chairpersons of the National Committee of the Chinese People's Political Consultative Conference